Ostrov nad Oslavou is a market town in Žďár nad Sázavou District in the Vysočina Region of the Czech Republic. It has about 1,000 inhabitants.

Administrative parts
The village of Suky is an administrative part of Ostrov nad Oslavou.

References

Populated places in Žďár nad Sázavou District
Market towns in the Czech Republic